The year 1728 in science and technology involved some significant events.

Astronomy
 James Bradley uses stellar aberration (first observed in 1725) to calculate the speed of light to  be approximately 301,000 km/s.
 James Bradley observes nutation of the Earth's axis.

Botany
 September – Bartram's Garden, the oldest surviving botanic garden in North America, is established in Philadelphia by John Bartram.

Exploration
 July 14 – August 14 – Vitus Bering sails northward from the Kamchatka Peninsula, through the Bering Strait, and rounds Cape Dezhnev.

Physiology and medicine
 Pierre Fauchard publishes Le Chirurgien Dentiste, ou, Traité des Dents, the first comprehensive text on dentistry, including the first description of orthodontic braces.

Births
 February 13 – John Hunter, Scottish surgeon, pathologist and comparative anatomist (died 1793)
 March 20 – Samuel-Auguste Tissot, Swiss physician (died 1797)
 April 16 – Joseph Black, Scottish physicist and chemist (died 1799)
 August 26 – Johann Heinrich Lambert, Swiss polymath (died 1777)
 September 3 – Matthew Boulton, English mechanical engineer (died 1809)
 October 27 – James Cook, English explorer (died 1779)

Deaths
 April 25 – John Woodward, English naturalist (born 1665)
 August 11 – William Sherard, English botanist (born 1659)
 Caleb Threlkeld, Irish botanist (born 1676)

References

 
18th century in science
1720s in science